The 2009 Kobalt Tools 500 was the fourth stock car race of the 2009 NASCAR Sprint Cup Series. It was held on March 8, 2009, in Hampton, Georgia, at Atlanta Motor Speedway, before a crowd of 94,400 attendees. The circuit is an intermediate track that holds NASCAR races. The 325-lap race was won by Penske Racing Championship's Kurt Busch from a second position start. Jeff Gordon of Hendrick Motorsports took second, with Roush Fenway Racing driver Carl Edwards in third.

Mark Martin won his first pole position since the 2001 season by posting the fastest lap in qualifying, and he held the lead for the first six laps, until Busch overtook him on the seventh lap. He lost it after the first pit stop cycle to Ryan Newman but he passed him on the 18th lap to retake the position. After that, Busch ceded the lead to Jimmie Johnson after a refuelling problem during a pit stop, but he returned to the lead on lap 103. At the green–white–checker restart on lap 330, Edwards was in the first position, but he was passed by Kurt Busch on the outside lane soon after, and the latter held off Gordon for the remainder of the race to win. There were eleven cautions and thirteen lead changes amongst eight different drivers during the course of the event.

The victory was Busch's first of the season, his second at Atlanta Motor Speedway, and the 19th of his career, since he debuted in the 2000 season. The result advanced him from seventh to third in the Drivers' Championship; 46 points behind Gordon (whose second-place finish enabled him to increase his points advantage over Clint Bowyer). In the Manufacturers' Championship, Chevrolet lowered Ford's lead to two points, while Toyota and Dodge were tied for third with 33 races left in the season. The race had a television audience of 8,877,000 million.

Background 

The Kobalt Tools 500 was the fourth out of thirty-six scheduled stock car races of the 2009 NASCAR Sprint Cup Series. It was held on March 8, 2009, in Hampton, Georgia, at Atlanta Motor Speedway; an intermediate track that holds NASCAR races. The standard track at Atlanta Motor Speedway is a  four-turn quad-oval. The track's turns are banked at twenty-four degrees, while the front stretch, the location of the finish line, and the back stretch are banked at five degrees.

Before the race, Hendrick Motorsports' Jeff Gordon led the Drivers' Championship with 459 points, ahead of Clint Bowyer in second, and Matt Kenseth third. Greg Biffle and David Reutimann were fourth and fifth, and Kyle Busch, Kurt Busch, Tony Stewart, Carl Edwards, Bobby Labonte, Kevin Harvick, and Michael Waltrip rounded out the top twelve. In the Manufacturers' Championship, Ford led with 22 points; Chevrolet were in second place with 18 points. Toyota placed third with 16 points, and Dodge were fourth with ten points. Kyle Busch was the race's defending champion from the 2008 event.

Starting from the Atlanta round, NASCAR established a regulation that determines how long the restart zone is on each track. This added to a new rule devised by NASCAR at the start of the season, when they created a zone from which the race leader was required to commence the race for better consistency. NASCAR's vice-president of competition Robin Pemberton explained series officials would double the figure of the pit road speed limit, and then establish it as the distance in feet of the restart area, "It will be twice the pit-road speed. It’s a means to get variable lengths in there for the race track itself. It’s something the garage area asked us to do. Is it perfect; maybe, maybe not. But, it’s a start."

Practice and qualifying 

Three practice sessions were held before the Sunday race; one on Friday and two on Saturday. The first session lasted 90 minutes, and the second, scheduled for 45 minutes, was shortened to 20 minutes because of fog delaying qualifying for the Camping World Truck Series round. The final session ran for an hour. In the first practice session, Mark Martin was fastest with a 30.180 seconds lap, ahead of Harvick in second, and Brian Vickers in third. David Stremme was fourth-fastest, Juan Pablo Montoya placed fifth, and Kasey Kahne sixth. Kurt Busch, Edwards, Marcos Ambrose, and A. J. Allmendinger rounded out the session's top ten competitors.

Forty-seven drivers attempted to qualify on Friday evening, according to NASCAR's qualifying procedure forty-three were allowed to race. Each driver ran two laps, with the starting order determined by the competitor's fastest times. Martin took his first pole position since the 2001 Pontiac Excitement 400, and the 42nd of his career, with a time of 29.640 seconds. He was joined on the grid's front row by Kurt Busch whose best lap was 0.108 seconds behind because of his slower corner entry speed. Jamie McMurray was the highest-placed Ford driver in third. Montoya qualified fourth after a minor loss of car control leaving turn four, Biffle took fifth, and Denny Hamlin sixth. Jimmie Johnson, Joe Nemechek (the fastest driver to qualify on merit outside the top 35), Kyle Busch, and Harvick completed the top ten starters. The four drivers who did not qualify were Todd Bodine, Scott Riggs, Jeremy Mayfield, and Geoff Bodine. Tony Raines withdrew prior to qualifying. Martin said afterward, "I feel like a rookie, I really, really do. I'm still shaking. I thought I ran out of talent in turn four. There was no possible way to hold my foot on the floor and not hit the wall, back end first, in turn four. But that was really fun. I live to scare myself like that."

On Saturday morning Biffle was the fastest driver in the second practice session with a time of 30.030 seconds. Edwards was second, and Stremme in third. Hamlin was fourth-fastest, Kenseth came fifth, and Jeff Gordon sixth. Kyle Busch, Montoya, David Ragan, and Johnson followed in positions seven through ten. Later that day, Edwards paced the final practice session with a lap of 30.880 seconds, with Kahne three-hundredths of a second behind in second. Hamlin was third-fastest; Kurt Busch came fourth, McMurray placed fifth, and Biffle was sixth. Stremme was seventh-fastest, Jeff Gordon eighth, Martin ninth, and Aric Almirola completed the top ten ahead of the race. During practice, Martin Truex Jr. was in pain due to a small kidney stone. He was transported directly to the infield medical centre to undergo an examination, and later to Spalding Regional Medical Center in Griffin, Georgia for observation and further treatment. Because of NASCAR's drug regulations, he elected to forgo medications while passing the stone so that he could compete in the race.

Qualifying results

Race 
Live television coverage of the event, the 100th in NASCAR Cup Series competition at Atlanta Motor Speedway, commenced in the United States on Fox at 1:30 p.m. Eastern Standard Time (UTC−04:00). Lead pastor Chris Patton of Southside Church in Peachtree City, Georgia began pre-race ceremonies with an invocation. Country music artist and songwriter Richie McDonald performed the national anthem, and the command for drivers to start their engines was given by Kelly Brown, vice president of merchandising for Lowe's. During the pace laps, Ragan dropped to the rear of the field because of an engine change. Poor track grip caused drivers to battle for control of their cars during the event.

The race commenced at 2:18 local time. Martin maintained the first position on the entry to turn one. The first caution was waved on the next lap as Reed Sorenson made contact with the wall lining the track at turn one after a car component failure. He drove to his garage for repairs. Martin held the lead at the lap six restart, followed by Kurt Busch and McMurray. On the following lap, Kurt Busch passed below Martin to take the lead. Labonte triggered the second caution five laps later, when he spun entering turn three, but avoided damage to his car. During the caution, some drivers including Kurt Busch, made pit stops for tires and car adjustments. Nemechek led for one lap before making his pit stop on the 14th lap. Ryan Newman then took the lead, and held it at the restart on lap 16. Kurt Busch overtook Martin for second place on the next lap. On the 18th lap, Kurt Busch steered right to the outside lane and passed Newman to reclaim the first position. Hamlin got ahead of Newman for second two laps later. Martin attempted to do the same for third, but he was unsuccessful. After starting 16th, Jeff Gordon advanced to ninth by the 23rd lap. Similarly, Edwards was in seventh by lap 31 after beginning from 29th place. Eight laps later, Dale Earnhardt Jr. lost tenth to Kyle Busch.

Green flag pit stops for tires, fuel, and car adjustments began on lap 53. Ambrose's gas man and firefighter Jimmy Watts ran across the grass, and was within  of the track when he retrieved the tire. NASCAR officials escorted Watts from pit road, and he was suspended for the remainder of the event. Kurt Busch made a second pit stop after a refuelling problem at a prior stop. The caution meant 15 drivers were on the lead lap, and Johnson led at the lap-74 restart. Two laps later, Jeff Gordon's clutch developed a problem. On lap 78, Edwards overtook Hamlin for second. Edwards got past Johnson on the outside lane for the lead on the 81st lap. Three laps later, Johnson was passed by Hamlin on the inside line while in slower traffic for the third position. On the 103rd lap, Kurt Busch passed Edwards around the outside to claim the first position. Labonte spun on the frontstretch on the lap, necessitating the fourth caution. Under caution, lapped drivers made pit stops for adjustments to their cars.

At the lap 112 restart, Kurt Busch kept the lead over Edwards and Bowyer. Edwards drove on the inside lane, while Kurt Busch ran on the outside line. As some drivers began another phase of green flag pit stops on the 155th lap, the fifth caution came out when fluids were found in turn two. Kurt Busch again held the lead at the lap 162 restart, followed by Bowyer. Two laps later, Bowyer fell to fifth when Jeff Gordon, Johnson, and Edwards got past him. He lost a further position to Martin on lap 166. Jeff Gordon caught and overtook Kurt Busch for first on the 172nd lap, but he did not hold it, as Kurt Busch re-passed him before crossing the start-finish line. On lap 183, Ambrose's car billowed smoke, and he stopped on the apron below the track. The sixth caution was issued two laps later as debris was located on the track. The leaders elected to make pit stops for tires and car adjustments during the caution. Truex led lap 190 but Kurt Busch was first at the lap 192 restart. Ragan made contact with his teammate Biffle on the 196th lap, causing him to go sideways into the wall, and prompting Biffle to regain control of his car. Six laps later, Kurt Busch glanced the wall, and Jeff Gordon passed him for the lead, but lost it to Busch before the conclusion of the lap.

On lap 204, Sam Hornish Jr. collided with the turn one wall, drifted back down the track, and collected Bill Elliott, prompting the seventh caution. The leaders, including Kurt Busch, chose to make pit stops for car adjustments and tires during the caution. Jeff Gordon took the lead and held it at the lap 209 restart, with Kurt Busch in second and Martin third. Five laps later, the eighth caution was given; Martin cut his right-rear tire, and went backward into the turn one barrier. His car sustained heavy rear sheet metal damage but he continued to pit road. The leaders again made pit stops under caution. Jeff Gordon led at the lap 222 restart. Hamlin was passed around the outside by Kurt Busch for third on lap 235. Five laps later, he caught and overtook Johnson for the second position. Kurt Busch narrowed Jeff Gordon's lead, and passed him on the outside lane leaving turn four to retake the lead on the 251st lap. The ninth caution came out nine laps later as debris from Robby Gordon's car was located in turn four. During the caution, the leaders went to pit road for fuel, tires and car adjustments. The restart on lap 265 was led by Kurt Busch from Vickers, and Bowyer. On lap 267, Scott Speed hit the wall leaving turn four, and slid into the front of Ragan's car. Biffle was collected by Speed, and was spun into the outside wall, and Jeff Burton went through the grass, activating the tenth caution.

Five drivers elected not to make pit stops under caution. Kurt Busch led the field back to racing speed on the lap 275 restart, with Vickers second. Earnhardt was passed by Stewart, and Burton after running close by Almirola on lap 279, and fell to 14th. Vickers reduced the lead of Kurt Busch, when the final caution was necessitated after Robby Gordon's tire shredded and scattered debris on the circuit. All of the leaders, including Kurt Busch, made pit stops for tires and fuel. Edwards won the race off pit road, and led on the green–white–checker restart (extending the race to 330 laps) on lap 329. Edwards lost the lead on the outside lane to Kurt Busch on the backstretch, and he was then passed by Jeff Gordon. Kurt Busch held off Jeff Gordon on the final lap to take his first win of the season, his second at Atlanta Motor Speedway, and the 19th of his career. Jeff Gordon finished second, ahead of Edwards in third. Harvick was fourth, and Vickers fifth. Bowyer, Kahne, Stewart, Johnson, and Truex completed the top ten finishers. There were thirteen lead changes among eight different drivers during the course of the race, Kurt Busch led six times for a total of 234 laps, more than any other driver.

Post-race 

Kurt Busch appeared in victory lane after his Polish victory lap to celebrate his first victory of the season in front of a crowd of 94,400 attendants; the win earned him $164,175. Kurt Busch thanked his team for providing him with a car that won him the race, "This car was unbelievable. I guess good things come to those who wait. I just drove (against) the track, not the competition, We had strong pit stops, a great-handling car, a strong motor and a great assistant spotter." Jeff Gordon was encouraged with his second-place finish, "It was a great day for us, though. Just driving to the front, battling up front, leading laps, battling for the lead at times. We lost a little something there in the long runs there, middle of the way on and those guys were a little bit stronger than us. But on the restarts, we were real strong." Edwards said of his third-place finish, “Third place, considering our pit debacle down there — we were boxed in, It was just a bad pit stall selection and it didn’t work out like we planned, but we made the most of it.”

Two days after the race, it was announced that Watts was suspended for the next four races of the season by NASCAR for transgressing Section 12–1: "actions detrimental to stock car racing", and Article 9-15-U, a regulation which forbids crew members from entering the boundaries of the track while cars were circulating for any reason. Additionally, he was placed on probation until December 31, 2009. Crew chief Frank Kerr was also put on probation until the end of the year because he was deemed responsible for Watts' actions. NASCAR stated that had Watts not ventured into the infield, they would have waved the caution once all cars had made their pit stops. Watts admitted to reacting inappropriately and apologized for his actions. According to Ambrose, the decision to suspend Watts was the correct move to take, "It was a disaster. But I think the penalty was a good one. You can't have guys running out to the race track. It's just not the thing to do. Jimmy is a great guy. He went on instinct. You can't blame the guy for that, either. I mean, he just went on a reaction and it was the wrong reaction. He needs to be an example for others not to do the same."

The result of the race meant Jeff Gordon extended his lead in the Drivers' Championship to 43 points ahead of Bowyer in second place. By winning the race, Kurt Busch advanced from seventh to third, while Edwards' third-place finish meant he was in the third position after being in eighth place going into the race. Kenseth fell to fifth in the standings. Stewart, Kyle Busch, Harvick, Kahne, Biffle, Vickers, and Reutimann rounded out the top twelve drivers. In the Manufacturers' Championship, Chevrolet cut Ford's lead to two points. Dodge tied with Toyota in third place with 33 races left in the season. The event had a television audience of 8,877,000 million; it took 3 hours, 59 minutes and 1 second to complete the race, and the margin of victory was 0.332 seconds.

Race results

Standings after the race 

Drivers' Championship standings

Manufacturers' Championship standings

 Note: Only the top twelve positions are included for the driver standings.

References 

Kobalt Tools 500
Kobalt Tools 500
NASCAR races at Atlanta Motor Speedway
March 2009 sports events in the United States